Aguinaldo, officially the Municipality of Aguinaldo,  is a 2nd class municipality in the province of Ifugao, Philippines. According to the 2020 census, it has a population of 21,128 people.

Batas Pambansa Bilang 86, approved on September 20, 1980, created the municipality out of Barangays Bunhian, Damag, Galonogon, Itab, Jacmal, Taang, Talete and Ubao, from the Municipality of Mayoyao.

The economy is mostly agricultural with palay as the main crop.

Geography

Barangays
Aguinaldo is politically subdivided into 16 barangays. These barangays are headed by elected officials: Barangay Captain, Barangay Council, whose members are called Barangay Councilors. All are elected every three years.

Climate

Demographics

Economy

Government
Aguinaldo, belonging to the lone congressional district of the province of Ifugao, is governed by a mayor designated as its local chief executive and by a municipal council as its legislative body in accordance with the Local Government Code. The mayor, vice mayor, and the councilors are elected directly by the people through an election which is being held every three years.

Elected officials

References

External links
Municipality of Aguinaldo official website
 [ Philippine Standard Geographic Code]
Philippine Census Information
Local Governance Performance Management System

Municipalities of Ifugao